Ritva Hannele Lauri (born 21 July 1952 in Tampere, Finland) is a Finnish actress known for her roles in multiple comedy series. The artistic focus of her career is in stage acting.

She was born Hannele Markkula to parents Arvi Markkula, a colonel and Eine Markkula, a shopkeeper. She married the actor Hannu Lauri in 1976 and had two sons, Sami (1977) and Tomi (1979). The couple divorced in 1994. She was briefly married to Teemu Rinne in the early 2000s.

After having studied acting at the Helsinki Theatre Academy, Hannele Lauri began her professional career in the Jyväskylä City Theatre. The period lasted from 1975 till 1977, after which she worked as a free-lancer till 1981. After a short period in the Turku City Theatre she started her ongoing contract with the Helsinki City Theatre in 1983. Her early stage roles include Ophelia. During the same period she was also cast in the movies directed by Risto Jarva and Jaakko Pakkasvirta.

She began to achieve popularity in Finland in the 1980s through her collaboration with Spede Pasanen. She appeared in popular television productions and comedy feature films created by Pasanen and the Vesa-Matti Loiri. She has been in the national limelight ever since. In the 1990s, she starred in the television comedy series  ("Moving In Together") together with the comedian Eija Vilpas. In 2003 she portrayed the role of a woman going through her menopause in the comedy series  ("Hot Waves").

In 2010s Hannele Lauri has made several supporting roles in Finnish movies and frequent television appearances along with her stage career.

References

External links

1952 births
Living people
actresses from Tampere
Finnish actresses